Gerhard Abstreiter is a German physicist and professor of physics at Technical University of Munich (TUM), currently holding the university's highest honor, the Emeritus of Excellence and also being a distinguished visiting professor at University of California, Santa Barbara. From 1987 to 2015, he was a full professor at TUM and also, in 2010 and 2011, a distinguished visiting professor at University of Tokyo. He is a Fellow of the American Physical Society, Bavarian Academy of Sciences and Humanities and acatech.

He won the Max Born Medal and Prize in 1998.

References

Year of birth missing (living people)
Living people
Academic staff of the Technical University of Munich
21st-century German physicists
Fellows of the American Physical Society